This is a list of U.S. county name etymologies, covering the letters S to Z.

S

T

U

V

W

Y

Z

References

See also
Lists of U.S. county name etymologies for links to the remainder of the list.